Zavvi is an online retailer of entertainment products, including Blu-rays, collectables, homeware and toys. Originally a physical retailer, the brand has been online only since it was bought from administration by The Hut Group in 2009.

History

Virgin Megastores UK

Richard Branson started his first Virgin store on London's Oxford Street in 1971 and the first Megastore in 1979. The chain grew throughout the 1980s and 1990s and became an international franchise. During the early to mid-2000s, the Virgin Group sold most of its Virgin Megastores to various companies, including the French stores to the Lagardere Group and the American stores to The Related Companies.

Zavvi rebranding

In September 2007, it was announced that the UK arm of the Virgin Megastores brand was to break away from the Virgin Group. A management buyout offer was led by managing director, Simon Douglas, and finance director, Steve Peckham, reportedly for £1. Zavvi became the largest independent entertainment retailer in the UK. All 125 stores traded under the Zavvi brand, although some stores retained an individual Virgin Media concession that operated independently from the Zavvi store. In October 2007, the company launched a new logo featuring a Z in the dot of the i.

Zavvi Ireland had made a loss of €3.4 million in the year ending March 2007. In September 2007, Simon Douglas announced that Zavvi would focus on the sale of games to compete with Game and Gamestation. Plans were revealed that Zavvi would differentiate itself from its competitors with limited editions and exclusive products in addition to increasing the stores online market share during the next year. Following a trial period, it was announced on 28 March 2008 that all Zavvi stores would feature a book department.

Prior to entering administration, Zavvi was in the process of creating an online download service, Zavvi Downloads, intended to compete with services including Napster and the iTunes Store. It was planned the service would offer music which would not carry any digital rights management, meaning that it could be transferred to any portable music player without restrictions. It would also have a catalogue of films and TV shows, games and mobile content. On 15 January 2009, Ernst & Young announced that they cancelled Zavvi's plan to launch the online download service as the company entered administration.

Administration
In December 2008, The Daily Telegraph reported that Zavvi was seeking help from the Virgin Group to guarantee millions of pounds worth of its stock payments to Woolworths' Entertainment UK (EUK) as EUK had entered into administration. The Times reported that Ernst & Young may step in if Zavvi could not pay EUK the value of the stock which amounted to a £106 million debt. Zavvi was forced to shut down its internet operations, as it entered into talks with EUK and Deloitte & Touche, EUK's administrators. A spokesman for Virgin, said that a deal had been done with the administrators of Woolworths who accepted £40 million to settle the debt. On 8 December 2008, Zavvi suspended its sale of gift cards citing the problems with its supplier, EUK, as the cause.

On 24 December 2008, the Zavvi UK group went into administration owing to the loss of its supplier as the company was unable to source stock. Zavvi had attempted to buy supplies from alternative suppliers but experienced difficulties in obtaining favourable credit terms or acceptable prices. This placed pressure on the company's working capital and when quarterly rents were due, approximately £13 million, on 25 December 2008, the directors were unable to meet their creditor liabilities.

Ernst & Young LLP were appointed administrators, and Zavvi continued to trade as a buyer was sought. Zavvi Guernsey was liquidated, while Zavvi Ireland was not at the time subject to any formal insolvency proceedings. At the time of administration, Zavvi had 114 stores in the UK and 11 in Ireland, employing 2,363 permanent staff and 1,052 temporary staff. All stores opened as normal on Boxing Day / St Stephen's Day, 26 December, for the normal post-Christmas sale. Zavvi Ireland entered liquidation in January 2009. On 13 January, Zavvi Entertainment Group Limited entered administration.

In January 2009, HMV revealed that it had acquired five stores in Ireland and nine in the United Kingdom, saving 269 jobs. The purchase price for the nine UK stores was approximately £630,000.

Head Entertainment, a company created by former managing director, Simon Douglas, and business partner, Les Whitfield, purchased five stores. 222 employees and the remaining Zavvi stock were transferred to Head, and the total purchase cost was £111,000. All other stores were closed. Head itself was a short-lived venture, having closed all of its stores by early 2010.

The Zavvi brand and domain name was sold following an online auction in February 2009. It was relaunched by new owners, The Hut Group, on 2 March 2009. The website was renamed Zavvi.com in October 2009.

References 

THG (company)
British companies established in 2007
Retail companies established in 2007
Online retailers of the United Kingdom
Retail companies of England